Philip Yeboah Ankrah (born 27 September 2002) is a Ghanaian professional footballer who plays as a forward for Italian  club Mantova on loan from Verona.

Club career
Yeboah made his Serie A debut for Verona on 19 December 2020 in a game against Fiorentina. He substituted Mattia Zaccagni in the 78th minute of a 1–1 away draw.

On 21 January 2021, he signed a 2.5-year professional contract with Verona. On 16 July 2022, Yeboah was loaned to Mantova.

References

External links
 

2002 births
Living people
Ghanaian footballers
Association football forwards
Hellas Verona F.C. players
Mantova 1911 players
Serie A players
Ghanaian expatriate footballers
Ghanaian expatriate sportspeople in Italy
Expatriate footballers in Italy